Crowell Independent School District is a public school district based in Crowell, Texas (USA).

The district serves all of Foard County, and extends into small portions of King and Knox counties.

Crowell ISD has one campus -

Grades PK-12th

In 2015, the school district was rated "academically acceptable" by the Texas Education Agency.

References

External links
Crowell ISD

School districts in Foard County, Texas
School districts in King County, Texas
School districts in Knox County, Texas